Sanele Tshabalala (born 12 May 1998) is a South African professional soccer player who plays as a goalkeeper for Moroka Swallows.

Born in Dobsonville, Tshabalala played youth football for Orlando Pirates and Bidvest Wits before joining Kaizer Chiefs's academy in 2018. He joined Moroka Swallows in 2019. He represented the South Africa under-20 team at the 2017 Africa U-20 Cup of Nations.

References

1998 births
Living people
South African soccer players
South Africa under-20 international soccer players
Sportspeople from Soweto
Orlando Pirates F.C. players
Bidvest Wits F.C. players
Kaizer Chiefs F.C. players
Moroka Swallows F.C. players
South African Premier Division players
Association football goalkeepers